Dodger Dogs to Fenway Franks: And All the Wieners In Between is a 1988 book  by Bob Wood. It was published by McGraw-Hill and covers Wood's trip to all 26 Major League Baseball (at the time) stadiums in one summer

Synopsis
In 1985 the then-28-year-old Wood was a high-school history teacher in Seattle, Washington, when he took a trip to all 26 Major League Baseball stadiums in one summer. Wood decided to assign a letter grade in each of eight categories and rank the stadiums from best to worst. Dodger Stadium and Royals Stadium tied for first while the Astrodome and Exhibition Stadium would finish as the two worst. To save money he would often sleep at Kampgrounds of America or Motel 6. Wood additionally sold his Ford Pinto and bought a 1985 Toyota Tercel for its good fuel mileage and reliability.

Reception
The Chicago Tribune reviewed the work, calling it a "plumply loving and impressionistic look at the romping grounds of the demigods of the national pastime." In his book 501 Baseball Books Fans Must Read Before They Die, Ron Kaplan stated that while most of the stadiums in Dodger Dogs to Fenway Franks are no longer in business, the work "evokes a lot of memories and Dodger Dogs serves as a guide for future customer-service business models."

A story by James Crabtree about the 20th anniversary of Dodger Dogs to Fenway Franks was published Baseball Musings in 2008.

See also
Dodger Dog

References

External links
Baseball Musings story about 20th anniversary of Dodger Dogs to Fenway Franks
Yahoo Sports post about the 20th anniversary.

1988 non-fiction books
1985 Major League Baseball season
American non-fiction books
American travel books
Major League Baseball books
McGraw-Hill books